Tetrazygia albicans is a species of plant in the family Melastomataceae. It is endemic to Jamaica.  It is threatened by habitat loss.

References

albicans
Endangered plants
Endemic flora of Jamaica
Taxonomy articles created by Polbot